Postscriptum is an album by Czesław Niemen released in 1980. "Dziwny jest ten świat '79" is a new version of Niemen's best known song "Dziwny jest ten świat".

Track listing 
 "Dziwny jest ten świat '79" - 4:14 (lyrics Czesław Niemen)
 "Pokój" - 4:42 (lyrics Sergiusz Michałkow)
 "Nim przyjdzie wiosna" - 5:15 (lyrics Jarosław Iwaszkiewicz)
 "Elegia śnieżna" - 6:02 (lyrics Jan Brzechwa)
 "Moje zapatrzenie" - 6:10 (lyrics Czesław Niemen)
 "Serdeczna muza" - 3:23 (lyrics Czesław Niemen)
 "Żyć przeciw wojnie" - 7:24 (instrumental)
 "Postscriptum" - 2:52 (lyrics Czesław Niemen)
 "Panflutronik (wymarsz na wczasy)" - 3:13 (instrumental, 2007 CD reissue bonus)
 "Wakacje 1939" - 12:12 (instrumental, 2007 CD reissue bonus)

Personnel 
Czesław Niemen - vocal, keyboards, moog

Czesław Niemen albums
1980 albums